Taher Shekh (Sheykh / Sheikh / Shaikh) olhokamaei, Alhokamei (Persian: طاهر شیخ الحکمایی, born 1954) is an Iranian contemporary sculptor.

He was born in Kazeroon County, Fars Province of Iran. Shekholhokamaei studied sculpture at Tehran University College of Fine Arts receiving his BFA degree in sculpture in 1988, and his Ph.D. equivalency  & 1st degree ranking in sculpture in 2005. Al Hokamaii was also awarded an honorary diploma from the St. Petersburg State University of Culture and Arts (Russian: Санкт-Петербургский государственный университет культуры и искусств) on August 11, 2015

His notable contributions to the international sculpture symposium includes the design and implementation of Kindness (محبت) in Lebanon, Windward (بادگیر) in Bahrain, Bob Ol-Eshgh (باب العشق) in Dubai, Sanctuary  (محراب) in Kuwait, Safe Zone (مکان امن)]in Dubai and Commemoration of Victims of Chemical Weapons] in Hague, Netherlands to name a few. His works of art and monuments have been exhibited in 17 countries.

Positions Held 
Taher Shekholhokamaei is University of Tehran's Dean of Sculpture Faculty and one of the most senior instructors of fine arts. He is also a faculty member of Tehran University, College of Fine Arts and a member in good standing of the Supreme Council of Iranian Artists.  He was the chairman of the Sculptor Artists Association of Iran up until 2010 and a Member of the Visual Arts Group from 1990 to 2006.

Responsibilities 
With reference to Al Hokamaii's most recent resume published in University of Tehran's official website, in addition to his academic positions, he has been in charge of numerous cultural and educational undertakings pertaining to his ongoing art and sculpting studies and endeavors since 1989 enumerated as follows.

Shekholhokamaei has been the Chairman of the board of Iran Sculptors Associations (since 2010). He has also been a member of several associations such as the Association of Iranian Sculptors' Board of Directors (1999 - 2001) and the Academy of Fine Arts (2003) in addition to being in charge of the Islamic Development Organization's Department of Art, Sculpting Group from 1989 to 1996. He was also the organizing member of several noteworthy Biennials for the past decade such as the 2nd Tehran Museum of Contemporary Sculpture Biennial (1999), the 3rd Tehran Museum of Contemporary Arts' Sculpture Biennial (2003), the 2nd Islamic Painting Biennial held at Academy of Fine Arts (2003), and the 4th Tehran Sculpture Biennial held at the Iran Academy of Arts (2005).

Shekholhokamaei has also served as secretary of the Sculpture's Department during the 1st Visual Festival's in 2006 titled "The Resistance", as well as Azadegan's Return to Iran Exhibition (Saba Gallery) in 2010. He has been the secretary of Qajar [dynasty] Sculpture Conference since 2008 to present date. His other responsibilities include advising Iran (Tehran) Sculptors Symposium (2006) and serving in talent selection team for the 2nd Contemporary Art Exhibition (Saba Gallery) in 2007.

Papers in National Journals 
Azami, Zahra, Mohammad Ali Sheikhol hokamaei, and Taher Sheikh alhokmaei. "A Comparative Study of Stucco Design and plants Motifs in Ctesiphon Palace and Early Iranian Mosques." Honar-ha-ye-Ziba 18, no. 4 (2013): 15.

Design and Implementation of Awards and Festival Statues 

Shekholhokamaei has designed and constructed awards presented at renowned film festivals, Biennials, and local art exhibitions since 1988 to present day so much so that he was invited to design and construct Kuwait Painting Biennial award (2008), the 1st Kuwait Symposium award (2009),  and Kuwait Visual Arts Association award (2009).

He has completed well over 32 major projects since 1988 some of which are gilded (gold plated) works of art. His awards have been presented in International Children and Adolescents Film Festival (1988), 11th to 17th Periodic Fajr Theater Festival's (1993), the Photography Biennial (1993), the Graphic Design Biennial (1994), the Painting Biennial (1994), the International Youth Film Festival (1994), the 1st Press Biennial (1994), the Sculpting Biennial (1995–present), the Int Doll Festival (1996), Bushehr Golden Palm Youth Film Festival (1998), the Caricature Biennial (1999–present), the Miniature Biennial (1999–present), Disabled Musicians Pan-Iran Music Biennial (2000), the Landscape Design Biennial (2001), The 1st and 2nd Islamic World Biennial (2001–2002), the Music House of Iran Festival (2006), the 8th Iran Pottery Biennial (2006), the Razavi Theater Festival (2006), the Contemporary Art Exhibition (2007), and the International Radio Production Festival (2007).

He has also designed and constructed the Iranian Contemporary Sculptor Biennial award (2000) The "Animation Award" for the Center for Intellectual Development of Children and Adolescents Festival (2002), "The Art of Resistance" memorial statue for the Department of Art (2003), the gilded Golden Harp award for the 20th Fajr Music Festival (2004), the "Sacrifice Award" for the Research Training Center of Tehran University (2005–present),  the gilded award for the 36th Roshd Film Festival (2006–present), The 2nd Sculpture Biennial Urban Space Award (2010) and Dr Chamran's Innovation and Entrepreneurship Award (2010).

Works 
Shekholhokamaei's works are listed below.

Memorial Monuments and Statues 
 Design and construction of the memorial monument of Mr. Mandela, commemorating his visit to University of Tehran (1992)
 Design and implementation of Khorramshahr city's 3 meter-high steel statue titled "Mother" (1996)
 Design and construction of Abadan city's 5 meter-high bronze memorial monument titled "Jahad Sazandegi" (1997)
 Design and construction of Abadan city's 2 meter-high bronze memorial monument titled "Peyk Shahadat" (1997)
 Design and construction of Susangerd city's 2 meter-high bronze twin memorial monuments installed at Tatk Alley (1998)
 Design and construction of Master Hossein Behzad 80 cm high portrait in bronze at Kish Island (1999)
 Design and construction of 3 meter- high The Compassion (محبت) monument, Iranian Artists Forum, Tehran (2009)

International Exhibitions and Biennials 
 Baku, Azerbaijan Group Exhibition - Sculptures (1992)
 Lalit Kala Museum, Delhi, India Triennial Exhibition (1995)
 Sharjah, UAE International Exhibition (1999)
 Caracas, Venezuela Group Exhibition - Sculptures (1999)
 Kiev, Ukraine Group Exhibition - Sculptures (1999)
 Beirut, Lebanon Group Exhibition at International Symposium (2000)
 Monte Carlo, France Group Exhibition - Sculptures (2002)
 Paris, France Cité internationale des arts, Iran Studio (2004)
 Dhaka, Bangladesh Iranian Artists Group Exhibition (2005)

Permanent Works Exhibited at International Museums 
 The Bull: Lalit Kala Museum of Art, Delhi, India (1995)
 Dance: Tehran Museum of Contemporary Art, Iran (1995)

See also
 Culture of Iran
 Islamic art
 Iranian art
 List of Iranian artists

References 

1954 births
Living people
Iranian sculptors
People from Kazerun